Scandium(III) chloride is the inorganic compound with the formula ScCl3. It is a white, high-melting ionic compound, which is deliquescent and highly water-soluble. This salt is mainly of interest in the research laboratory.  Both the anhydrous form and  hexahydrate (ScCl3•6H2O) are commercially available.

Structure
ScCl3 crystallises in the layered BiI3 motif, which features octahedral scandium centres. Monomeric ScCl3 is the predominant species in the vapour phase at 900 K, the dimer Sc2Cl6 accounts for approximately 8%. The electron diffraction spectrum indicates that the monomer is planar and the dimer has two bridging Cl atoms each Sc being 4 coordinate.

Reactions

ScCl3 is a Lewis acid that absorbs water to give aquo complexes.  According to X-ray crystallogrphy, one such hydrate is the salt trans-[ScCl2(H2O)4]Cl·2H2O. With the less basic ligand tetrahydrofuran, ScCl3 yields the adduct ScCl3(THF)3 as white crystals. This THF-soluble complex is used in the synthesis of organoscandium compounds. ScCl3 has been converted to its dodecyl sulfate salt, which has been investigated as a "Lewis acid-surfactant combined catalyst" (LASC) in aldol-like reactions.

Reduction
Scandium(III) chloride was used by Fischer et al. who first prepared metallic scandium by electrolysis of a eutectic melt of scandium(III) chloride and other salts at 700-800 °C.

ScCl3 reacts with scandium metal to give a number of chlorides where scandium has an oxidation state <+3, ScCl, Sc7Cl10, Sc2Cl3, Sc5Cl8 and Sc7Cl12. For example, reduction of ScCl3 with scandium metal in the presence of caesium chloride gives the compound CsScCl3 which contain linear chains of composition ScIICl3−, containing ScIICl6 octahedra sharing faces.

Uses
Scandium(III) chloride is found in some halide lamps, optical fibers, electronic ceramics, and lasers.

References

Scandium compounds
Chlorides
Metal halides